Ray Sharma is the founding partner and CEO of Extreme Venture Partners, the founder of XMG Studio and a super angel investor.

Education and career

Sharma was born in Anandpur Sahib, Punjab, India. He obtained his degree in Business Administration from the Ivey School of Business at The University of Western Ontario.

Sharma started his career in the global investment banking industry where he worked as a stock market analyst, focusing on wireless-related technology companies at Credit Suisse First Boston in San Francisco before moving to BMO Nesbitt Burns and GMP Securities in Toronto.

In 2007, he co-founded Extreme Venture Partners, an early-stage venture capital firm in Toronto. He later co-founded Extreme Accelerator which offered funding, mentorship, and resources for startups relocating to Canada. In 2009, he founded XMG Studio, a mobile games studio, after being inspired by his children on the convenience of mobile games versus traditional consoles. His private investments outside those at Extreme Venture Partners include Athabasca Oil, Bridgewater, and Cancervax - all of which underwent an initial public offering.

In addition, Sharma has spoken at mobile industry events including Interactive Ontario's iP3 Forum, the 2013 Milken Institute Global Conference, the 2012 Application Developers Conference hosted by Scotia Capital, and the 2010 CTIA Mobile Web and Apps World Forum. In February 2013, Sharma participated in a discussion panel with Tony Clement and other entrepreneurs and developers over the open data made available by the Canadian government. Through XMG Studio, he founded The Great Canadian Appathon in 2011, an app-building competition for Canadian university students.

Sharma is also a guest author for Pocket Gamer and The Globe and Mail. He has also served on the Ontario Judicial Council, the Government of Canada's Advisory Panel on Open Government and the Royal Ontario Museum's Board of Trustees. He is also the creator of the Canadian Open Data Experience (CODE), which is Canada's largest open data hackathon. In 2015, Sharma co-founded Hackergal - a not-for-profit organization that aims to introduce young girls to coding. In that same year, he also co-founded Hackworks, a Toronto-based company that specializes in executing hackathons and open innovation events.

In 2019, an Ontario Superior Court ruling found that Chamath Palihapitiya and two former partners at Extreme Venture Partners conspired to hide an interest in dating app Tinder as part of a sale of shares in Xtreme Labs - resulting in the three paying $15.69 million to Extreme Venture Partner's current partners and co-founders.

References

External links
Extreme Venture Partners Website
Hackworks Website
Hackergal Website

1973 births
Living people